Hrabrino is a village in the Rodopi Municipality, Plovdiv Province in southern Bulgaria. According to a 2011 census, the village has a population of 661 people.

Geography 
The village is situated in the Rhodope Mountains at 15 km to the south-west of Bulgaria's second largest city, Plovdiv. There are two large and expanding villa zones in the mountainous part of the village. There are two rivers flowing through the village. Hrabrino is a starting point of tourist tracks leading to several refuges in the mountain.

History 

Until 1934 the village was known as Sveti Spas and until 1960 its name was Sotir.

Landmarks 

There are a church and four chapels in Hrabrino. The Chapel of St Dimitar is situated in the highest point of the village near the monument to the partisans of the Rhodope region. At 5 km from the center at the direction to Brestovitsa is located the Chapel of St Spas after which the village was named until 1960.

There are also two bridges dating from the Roman rule.

Gallery

External links 
 Radio and television in Hrabrino

Notes 

Villages in Plovdiv Province